The Fiji women's national field hockey team represents Fiji in international field hockey competitions and is controlled by the Fiji Hockey Federation.

Results

Oceania Cup
2007 –

Hockey World League
2012–13 – Second round
2014–15 – First round
2016–17 – First round

FIH Hockey Series
2018–19 – Second round

Pacific Games
2003 – 
2007 – 
2015 –

See also

Fiji men's national field hockey team

References

Oceanian women's national field hockey teams
Field hockey
National team
Women's sport in Fiji